Liang Qiuxia (Chinese: 梁秋霞 W.-G. Liang Chiu Hsia, born, Cirebon, West Java; 9 September 1950) is a former badminton player representing China, after migrating from Indonesia. She is also the sister of 6 time All-England Men Doubles Champion, Tjun Tjun, who represented Indonesia.

Liang Qiuxia was one of the most important Chinese badminton players of the 1970s. During this era China belonged to the WBF, which it sponsored, and the larger IBF, so that Liang Qiuxia could rarely compete with the best of the world. In 1974 she won silver in the Asian Games in Women's Singles and Gold in Women's Doubles with Cheng Huiming. In 1976, she became Asian champion, and in 1978 she once again won the Asian Games in the women's singles. After her active career, she became a coach of the Indonesian national team, coaching Olympic champion and one of the all-time greats Susi Susanti.

Major achievements in badminton

References 
 ^http://www.badmintoncn.com/cbo_star/star_145.html

Chinese female badminton players
1950 births
Living people
People from Cirebon
Sportspeople from West Java
Indonesian people of Chinese descent
Asian Games medalists in badminton
Badminton players at the 1978 Asian Games
Badminton players at the 1974 Asian Games
Asian Games gold medalists for China
Asian Games silver medalists for China
Medalists at the 1978 Asian Games
Medalists at the 1974 Asian Games